Sandhurst often refers to:

 Royal Military Academy Sandhurst, near the town of Sandhurst in Berkshire, England 
 Royal Military College, Sandhurst, its predecessor (before 1947)

Sandhurst may also refer to:

Places
 Sandhurst, Berkshire, England, a town
 Sandhurst, Gloucestershire, England, a village
 Sandhurst, Kent, England, a village
 Sandhurst, Victoria, a suburb of Melbourne, Australia 
 Bendigo, Victoria, Australia, formerly named Sandhurst
 Sandhurst Road, Mumbai, a railway station
 Sandhurst, Gauteng, South Africa, a suburb of Sandton

People
 Baron Sandhurst, a title in the peerage of the United Kingdom
 Sandhurst Tacama Miggins (born 1986), fashion model from Trinidad and Tobago
 Basil Sandhurst, a Marvel Comics fictional character
 Margaret Sandhurst (1828–1892), British suffragist

Other uses
 Sandhurst Competition, a military skills competition at West Point, US
 Sandhurst Las Vegas, a cancelled condominium project
 Sandhurst Trustees, a subsidiary of Bendigo and Adelaide Bank